Stanley Aborah (born 25 August 1969) is a retired Ghanaian footballer who played as a midfielder.

Aborah began his career with Asante Kotoko in 1987. He moved to Belgium in 1992 to play for Cappellen, spending four years with the club, before joining South Korean club Seongnam FC then known as Cheonan Ilhwa Chunma. He returned to Europe in 1999, playing in Germany for one season with Uerdingen 05 and one further season with Cappellen, before finishing his career with Volksvriend. Aborah was a member of the Ghana national team that finished second at the 1992 African Nations Cup in Senegal and was capped 11 times for his country in total. His son, also called Stanley, has played professional football for a number of clubs in Europe, including Dutch side Ajax.

External links
 
 
 

1969 births
Living people
Association football midfielders
Ghanaian footballers
Ghanaian expatriate footballers
Ghana international footballers
1992 African Cup of Nations players
Asante Kotoko S.C. players
Seongnam FC players
K League 1 players
Ghanaian expatriate sportspeople in South Korea
Expatriate footballers in Belgium
Expatriate footballers in South Korea
Ghanaian expatriate sportspeople in Belgium
Royal Cappellen F.C. players
KFC Uerdingen 05 players